John Alexander Wilson (21 April 1829 – 28 April 1909) was a notable New Zealand farmer, soldier, public servant, judge and businessman. He was born in Condé-sur-Noireau, France in 1829. He was the son of Anne Wilson and the Rev. John Alexander Wilson, who joined the Church Missionary Society (CMS) and was stationed at Tauranga. 

Wilson was a member of the Auckland Provincial Council, representing the Pensioner Settlements electorate from 7 October 1857 to 12 September 1861.  He was a judge at the Native Land Court for many years. He owned Whakaari/White Island off the coast from Tauranga and had it mined for sulphur.

References

1829 births
1909 deaths
People from Condé-sur-Noireau
French emigrants to New Zealand
New Zealand military personnel
19th-century New Zealand judges
New Zealand public servants
New Zealand farmers
Members of the Auckland Provincial Council
19th-century New Zealand businesspeople
19th-century New Zealand military personnel